In abstract algebra, a unital map on a C*-algebra is a map  which preserves the identity element:  

This condition appears often in the context of completely positive maps, especially when they represent quantum operations.  

If  is completely positive, it can always be represented as 

(The  are the Kraus operators associated with ).  In this case, the unital condition can be expressed as

References
 

C*-algebras